Central District No. 2 was an electoral district for the South Australian Legislative Council from 1913 until 1975. It was created by the Constitution Act Further Amendment Act 1913, which divided the Central District into two districts, each to elect four members. The size of the Legislative Council was to remain at 18 until the next general election, and increase to 20 by adding a new member for each of the two new districts. From its creation until the next general election (which was held on 27 March 1915), Central District No. 2 comprised the extant Assembly electoral district of Torrens. The act also redrew the Assembly electoral districts from the next election. From then, Central District No. 2 would comprise the new Assembly districts of Sturt and East Torrens.

Members
The Constitution Act Further Amendment Act provided that the six sitting members for Central District should decide amongst themselves which three represented each of the two new districts. The three who initially represented Central District No. 2 were Ern Klauer, Alfred William Styles and Frederick Samuel Wallis.

References

Former electoral districts of South Australia